Ethmia randyjonesi is a moth in the family Depressariidae. The habitat consists of rain forests.

The ground color of the forewings is whitish, with a series of elongated dark markings. The hindwing ground colour is whitish, becoming brownish at the apex.

Etymology
The species is named in honor of Randy Jones for his support of the beginning and growth of Instituto Nacional de Biodiversidad.

References

Moths described in 2014
[[Category:Ethmia|randyjonesi]